Sandal College Faisalabad is a district government school in Faisalabad, Pakistan. The school is situated on Millat Road near PTV Booster Faisalabad and is one of the largest buildings in the city in terms of area. The school has three sections, namely Junior Section, Senior Girls Section and Senior Boys Section.

History
The idea of establishing the English Medium Residential institution was conceived by Mr. A.Z.K Sherdil, the then Commissioner of Faisalabad Division. He proposed the idea of obtaining a vast piece of land allotted for the College. His successor Mr. Shahzad Hassan Pervez laid the foundation of the College building which was completed during the period of Mr. Tasneem Mukhtar Noorani, the then Commissioner. The institution started functioning during 1995 as a secondary school and was later upgraded to a College in 1998.

Sections
The school has been divided into three campuses.

Junior Section
New students are admitted to this section. The classes from playgroup to grade five take place here at the Junior section in co-education system. The Junior Section is headed by headmistress Mrs. Samreen Hasnat.

Senior Girls Section
Girls after being promoted from Junior school are promoted to the Senior Girls Section in grade sixth. The section holds classes for school from grade sixth to tenth. The classes for Fsc, pre-medical and pre-engineering are also held here. The girls section is headed by headmistress Mrs. Sughra Shami

Senior Boys Section
The classes for boys of the school between sixth to tenth grade and College (Fsc, Pre-medical and Pre-engineering) are held here. The boys section is headed by headmaster Baba Zafar l..

Hostel
The school has a hostel that provide residential and boarding facilities for the boys of the Senior Section.The Hostel is headed by headmistress Mrs. Abdul Rauf.

See also
Divisional Public School Faisalabad
Divisional Model College
Sadiq Public School
Aitchison College
Lawrence College Ghra Gali
Chenab College, Jhang

References

Education in Faisalabad
Schools in Faisalabad
Boarding schools in Pakistan